De Laatste Dagen van een Eiland  is a 1942 Dutch film directed by Ernst Winar.

Cast
Max Croiset		
Jules Verstraete		
Aaf Bouber		
Jeanne Verstraete		
Coen Hissink		
Daan Van Olleffen		
Marie Faassen		
Hedwig Flemming

External links 
 

1942 films
Dutch black-and-white films
Dutch drama films
1942 drama films